Regional Mexican Albums is a record chart published in Billboard magazine that features Latin music sales information for regional styles of Mexican music. This data are compiled by Nielsen SoundScan from a sample that includes music stores, music departments at department stores and verifiable sales from concert venues in the United States.

Number-one albums

References 

United States Regional Albums
2016 in Latin music
Regional Mexican 2016